Alcolu is an unincorporated community and census-designated place (CDP) in Clarendon County, South Carolina, United States. As of the 2010 census, its population was 429. Alcolu has a post office with ZIP code 29001, which opened on August 17, 1888. It developed as a lumber and mill town.

History

Alcolu was established between 1885 and 1890 by D.W. Alderman as a company mill town; it was developed to house the employees of his timber company and lumber mill. These were located in a relatively isolated area. The name Alcolu is derived from "AL" for Alderman, "CO" for Coldwell (a friend), and "LU" for Lula, then the only daughter of D.W. Alderman and his wife.

When it was built, Alcolu was a company town where everybody worked in one of the various businesses of D.W. Alderman & Sons. The business grew to encompass logging operations, a saw mill, planing mill, hosiery mill, flooring mill, and extensive farming and cattle ranching. They also ran a cotton gin, hotel, company store, and several other businesses. Over time, the company helped found schools and churches, and built baseball fields, an electric plant, and a telephone system for the town. D.W. Alderman also founded the Alcolu and the Paroda railroads, and built the Alcolu railroad depot. The Alcolu Post Office was established on August 17, 1888. His friend Algernon Coldwell was appointed as its first Postmaster.

Company employees were paid in "babbits", a metal coin stamped with an "A", which could be used only in the company store. There they could buy groceries, see the doctor, get a haircut, or watch a show in the 200-seat auditorium upstairs. In 1919, the company opened the "Alderman 20 Stores in One" in nearby Manning, South Carolina. It was one of the first department stores in South Carolina and boasted of having the first elevator in town.

The site came to its attention to the scene on March 22nd 1944, when two girls Betty June Binnicker, aged 11, and Mary Thames, aged 7, were found dead after being murdered. Notably, 14-year-old George Stinney was wrongly found guilty of their murder and became the youngest person to be executed in the United States since 12-year old Hannah Ocuish in 1786. The decision was vacated in 2014.

In 1947, the Alderman family sold the lumber mill to the Southern Coatings & Chemical Company and the Williams Furniture Company. They, in turn, were bought more than two decades later in 1968 by the Georgia-Pacific company. Georgia-Pacific continued its operations in Alcolu until 2000, when the mill was finally closed. According to the 2010 census, the unincorporated town of Alcolu had a population of 429 people.

Geography
The southern edge of the CDP follows Interstate 95, which provides access at Exit 122. I-95 leads northeast  to Florence and southwest  to Santee. U.S. Route 521 runs through Alcolu, leading south to Manning and northwest  to Sumter.

Demographics

Notable people
 George Stinney, an African-American teenager, was convicted at age 14 of murdering two young girls in March 1944 and executed in June 1944. He was the youngest person to be executed in the U.S. during the 20th century. His conviction was vacated by an appeals court in 2014 because he did not receive a fair trial.

References

 U.S. Geological Survey. Best Practices National Structures Dataset. https://web.archive.org/web/20090825115836/http://bpgeo.cr.usgs.gov/. 30-Jul-2008.

Census-designated places in Clarendon County, South Carolina
Census-designated places in South Carolina
Unincorporated communities in South Carolina
Unincorporated communities in Clarendon County, South Carolina